A serotonin pathway identifies aggregate projections from neurons which synthesize and communicate the monoamine neurotransmitter serotonin. These pathways are relevant to different psychiatric and neurological disorders.

Pathways

Function

Given the wide area that the many serotonergic neurons innervate, these pathways are implicated in many functions, as listed above.  The caudal serotonergic nuclei heavily innervate the spinal cord, medulla and cerebellum.  In general, manipulation of the caudal nuclei(e.g. pharmacological, lesion, receptor knockout) that results in decreased activity decreases movement, while manipulations to increase activity cause an increase in motor activity.  Serotonin is also implicated in sensory processing, as sensory stimulation causes an increase in extracellular serotonin in the neocortex.  Serotonin pathways are thought to modulate eating, both the amount as well as the motor processes associated with eating.  The serotonergic projections into the hypothalamus are thought to be particularly relevant, and an increase in serotonergic signaling is thought to generally decrease food consumption (evidenced by fenfluramine, however, receptor subtypes might make this more nuanced). Serotonin pathways projecting into the limbic forebrain are also involved in emotional processing, with decreased serotonergic activity resulting in decreased cognition and an emotional bias towards negative stimuli.  The function of serotonin in mood is more nuanced, with some evidence pointing towards increased levels leading to depression, fatigue and sickness behavior; and other evidence arguing the opposite.

See also
 Dopaminergic pathways

References

Neurotransmitters